John Smith (1854–1927) was a Scottish minister who served as Moderator of the General Assembly of the Church of Scotland in 1922 and was also heavily involved in Scottish education including Chairman of Govan School Board.

Life

He was born on 14 October 1854 the son of Robert Smith, an iron merchant at Tollcross in Glasgow. He was not born in Glasgow but moved there at an early age: being educated at St John's Academy, Glasgow then Glasgow High School. Around 1868 he began an apprenticeship as a "measurer". However, he decided he wished to join the church and therefore went to study at Glasgow University around 1872, graduating MA (1877) BD (1880). He was licensed to preach in 1880.

He was ordained as a minister of the Church of Scotland of North Parish in Stirling in June 1881. As with many of the larger Scottish cities this was one of three parishes contained on one building: the Church of the Holy Rude. He translated to Partick Parish Church in June 1886 replacing Rev John Calder. In 1903 Glasgow University aardec him an honorary Doctor of Divinity.

In 1922 he succeeded James A. McClymont as Moderator of the General Assembly of the Church of Scotland the highest position in the Scottish Church. He was succeeded in turn by George Milligan.

He had joined Stirling School Board in 1882 and continued a strong interest in education. He was Convenor of the General Assembly's Education Committee and oversaw the Sabbath School Committee. He was also Chairman of Govan's Education Committee for 15 years. He was a member of Glasgow University Court, Chairman of the Scottish Education Committee, President of the Scottish School Boards. He was made an honorary Fellow of the Educational Institute of Scotland.

He died in Partick on 9 June 1927 and is buried in Craigton Cemetery.

Family

In August 1882 he married authoress Helen Johnston (1860–1926), daughter of Gilbert Johnston of Shettleston. They had several children:

Jane Briggs Burns Smith (born 1883) married William Stevenson Brownlee of Clydebank
Helen Johnston Smith (born 1885) married Brodie Smith Gilfillan of Inch
Lt Robert Stanley Smith (born 1887) of the Argyll and Sutherland Highlanders
Cpt. John Sydney Smith (born 1889) of the Highland Light Infantry
Esther Struthers Johnston Smith (1891–1907)
Gilbert Johnston Smith (1897–1947) Lt in the Royal Flying Corps and Royal Air Force captured in 1918 but survived. Qualified as a physician and later served as Governor of Insein Prison in Burma

Publications
Short Studies in the Gospel (1901)
Andrew Melville (1910)
Broken Links in Scottish Education (1912)
Rise and Growth of Continuation Classes (1912)
The Hebrew Psalmist and the Scottish Bard (1918)
Education and the Church (1922)

He was joint author of the "Sunday School Teachers Handbook".

References
 

1854 births
1927 deaths
Clergy from Glasgow
Alumni of the University of Glasgow
Moderators of the General Assembly of the Church of Scotland